"Go!!!" is Flow's fourth single. Its A-side was used as the fourth opening for the popular Japanese anime Naruto. It reached #6 on the Oricon charts in its first week where it stayed on the Oricon's Top 10 for 3 straight weeks. It charted for 22 weeks total.

Track listing

Covers 
The song was covered by Argonavis, a fictional rock band from multimedia franchise Argonavis from BanG Dream! during their pre-debut live Argonavis 0-2nd LIVE -The Beginning- held on September 15, 2018. It was playable in the game Argonavis from BanG Dream! AAside on January 14, 2021 while the full version is included on "Argonavis Cover Collection -Mix-", released on November 17, 2021.

References

External links 
 

2004 singles
2004 songs
Flow (band) songs
Ki/oon Music singles
Naruto songs
Song articles with missing songwriters